In the mathematical subject of group theory, a co-Hopfian group is a group that is not isomorphic to any of its proper subgroups. The notion is dual to that of a Hopfian group, named after Heinz Hopf.

Formal definition 

Examples and non-examples

Every finite group G is co-Hopfian.
The infinite cyclic group  is not co-Hopfian since  is an injective but non-surjective homomorphism.
The additive group of rational numbers  and the quotient group  are co-Hopfian.
The multiplicative group  of nonzero rational numbers is not co-Hopfian, since the map  is an injective but non-surjective homomorphism. In the same way, the group  of positive rational numbers is not co-Hopfian.
The multiplicative group  of nonzero complex numbers is not co-Hopfian.
For every  the free abelian group  is not co-Hopfian.
For every  the free group  is not co-Hopfian.
There exists a finitely generated non-elementary (that is, not virtually cyclic)  virtually free group which is co-Hopfian. Thus a subgroup of finite index in a finitely generated co-Hopfian group need not be co-Hopfian, and being co-Hopfian is not a quasi-isometry invariant for finitely generated groups.
Baumslag–Solitar groups , where , are not co-Hopfian.
If G is the fundamental group of a closed aspherical manifold with nonzero Euler characteristic (or with nonzero simplicial volume or nonzero L2-Betti number), then G is co-Hopfian.
If G is the fundamental group of a closed connected oriented irreducible 3-manifold M then G is co-Hopfian if and only if no finite cover of M is a torus bundle over the circle or the product of a circle and a closed surface.
If G is an irreducible lattice in a real semi-simple Lie group and G is not a virtually free group then G is co-Hopfian.
If G is a one-ended torsion-free word-hyperbolic group then G is co-Hopfian, by a result of Sela.
If G is the fundamental group of a complete finite volume smooth Riemannian n-manifold (where n > 2) of pinched negative curvature then G is co-Hopfian. 
The mapping class group of a closed hyperbolic surface is co-Hopfian.
The group Out(Fn) (where n>2) is co-Hopfian.
Delzant and Polyagailo gave a characterization of co-Hopficity for geometrically finite Kleinian groups of isometries of  without 2-torsion.
A finitely generated torsion-free nilpotent group G may be either co-Hopfian or not co-Hopfian, depending on the properties of its associated rational Lie algebra.
Grigorchuk group G of intermediate growth is not co-Hopfian.
Thompson group F is not co-Hopfian.
There exists a finitely generated group G which is not co-Hopfian but has Kazhdan's property (T).
If G is Higman's universal finitely presented group then G is not co-Hopfian, and G cannot be embedded in a finitely generated recursively presented co-Hopfian group.

Generalizations and related notions

A group G is called finitely co-Hopfian if whenever  is an injective endomorphism whose image has finite index in G then . For example, for  the free group  is not co-Hopfian but it is finitely co-Hopfian.
A finitely generated group G is called scale-invariant if there exists a nested sequence of subgroups of finite index of G, each isomorphic to G, and whose intersection is a finite group. 
A group G is called dis-cohopfian if there exists an injective endomorphism  such that . 
In coarse geometry, a metric space X is called quasi-isometrically co-Hopf if every quasi-isometric embedding  is coarsely surjective (that is, is a quasi-isometry). Similarly, X is called coarsely co-Hopf if every coarse embedding  is coarsely surjective. 
In metric geometry, a metric space K is called quasisymmetrically co-Hopf if every quasisymmetric embedding  is onto.

See also
Hopfian object

References

Further reading
 K. Varadarajan,  Hopfian and co-Hopfian Objects, Publicacions Matemàtiques  36 (1992), no. 1, pp. 293–317

Group theory
Algebra